The King Salmon River is a  tributary of the Nushagak River in southwest Alaska, United States.

There are many rivers in Alaska bearing the name King Salmon River, including tributaries to the Egegik River and Ugashik River systems in southwest Alaska alone.  The name is also occasionally confused with that given the Kenai River, a popular fishing stream located in the Cook Inlet drainage of southcentral Alaska.

Besides king salmon, the river is also hosts pink salmon, grayling, burbot, whitefish and Arctic char.

See also
List of rivers of Alaska

References

External links 
Float fishing the King Salmon river.

Rivers of Dillingham Census Area, Alaska
Rivers of Alaska
Rivers of Unorganized Borough, Alaska